PC-20 or PC20 may refer to
Amstrad PC20, a computer 
Penske PC-20, a car
Commodore PC-20, a computer